The Johannes Jansen House, also known as Johannes Jansen House and Dutch Barn, is located along Decker Road at the foot of the Shawangunk Ridge in the western section of the Town of Shawangunk, in Ulster County, New York, United States. It was started by Jansen, who had settled the area along with his brother Thomas, whose own house is a mile (1.6 km) to the southeast, in 1750. His son finished it in the newer Federal style 53 years later. The property also boasts a Dutch barn.

It and the house were added to the National Register of Historic Places in 1983.

References

Houses in Ulster County, New York
Houses on the National Register of Historic Places in New York (state)
National Register of Historic Places in Ulster County, New York
Shawangunk, New York
Houses completed in 1750
Federal architecture in New York (state)